TGC may refer to:

Companies and organisations
Taiwan Garrison Command (1948–1992). former secret police unit of the Republic of China Armed Forces
Thatgamecompany, a US videogame developer
The Gospel Coalition, a US religious organization
The Grantsmanship Center, a US non-profit organization which provides training in grant application
Autoridad Única del Transporte de Gran Canaria, the transport authority on Gran Canaria in the Canary Islands
Tren de Gran Canaria, a planned railway line in the Canary Islands

Media and entertainment
The Golden Compass (Northern Lights (Pullman novel)), a young-adult fantasy novel by Philip Pullman
The Golf Channel, a US sports TV channel
ReBoot: The Guardian Code (2018), a Canadian live-action/CGI-animated television series
TGC (musical duo) A European musical duo, who write and self-produce atmospheric electro-pop music

Science and medicine
Thyroglossal cyst, a fibrous cyst that forms in the throat from a persistent thyroglossal duct
Tight glucose control,  a practice in the medical treatment of diabetes
Time gain compensation, a setting applied in diagnostic ultrasound imaging
TGC, a codon for the amino acid Cysteine

Other
Thai Green curry, a Thai dish
The Grand Canyon, of the Colorado River in Arizona, USA
The Great Courses, college-level audio and video courses by The Teaching Company
Tokyo Girls Collection, a Japanese semi-annual fashion show
Tradable green certificate, a European certificate representing production of some quantity of electricity by renewable processes
Triple Gold Club, ice hockey players who have won the Stanley Cup, the Olympic gold medal in hockey, and the hockey World Championship